Polydrachma is a genus of moths belonging to the subfamily Tortricinae of the family Tortricidae.

Species
Polydrachma aleatoria Meyrick, 1928
Polydrachma virescens Diakonoff, 1975

See also
List of Tortricidae genera

References

External links
tortricidae.com

Tortricidae genera
Epitymbiini